Đurakovo is a village in the municipality of Veliko Gradište, Serbia. According to the 2002 census, the village has a population of 338 people.

References

Populated places in Braničevo District